Osama Mazini is a senior political leader of Hamas, a Palestinian paramilitary and political organization with ties to the group's military wing, the Izz ad-Din al-Qassam Brigades.

He was in charge of negotiation affairs dealing with captured Israeli soldier Gilad Shalit.

In a 2006 sermon, he criticized Pope Benedict XVI over the latter's remarks on Islam, saying that the pontiff was criminal and arrogant.

During Israel's air strikes against the Gaza Strip in December 2008, Mazini warned Israel about sending in ground forces, stating "the people of Gaza are waiting to see the Zionist enemy in Gaza to tear them into pieces of flesh."

References

Hamas members
Living people
Year of birth missing (living people)